Hypoderma  may refer to:
 Hypoderma (fly), a fly genus in the subfamily Hypodermatinae
 Hypoderma (fungus), a genus of fungi in the family Rhytismataceae